Sahra Noor is a Somali-American nurse and health care executive.

Biography
Noor was born in Mogadishu, Somalia, but spent part of her childhood in Kenyan refugee camps. In the camp, she witnessed a lack of healthcare as she battled malaria and developed a desire to enter the field of healthcare. She moved to the United States as a refugee at the age of eighteen. Upon arriving, her family settled in Arlington, Virginia. She completed her high school career in two years at an alternative high school in Virginia. Noor attended St. Catherine University, where she received a nursing degree. She would wake up at three in the morning to study before taking her daughter to daycare and then attending classes. She later attended the University of Minnesota and received a MSc in Nursing and Health Systems Administration with a concentration in global health.

She serves as the chief executive officer at the People's Center Health Services in Minneapolis.

Personal life
Sahra is the sister of politician Ilhan Omar, one of the first two Muslim women to be elected to the United States Congress.

Noor has two children.

See also
Nimco Ahmed

References

Living people
American Muslims
Somalian Muslims
Ethnic Somali people
Somalian activists
Somalian women activists
Somalian emigrants to the United States
People from Mogadishu
Year of birth missing (living people)
American health care chief executives
African-American Muslims
African-American nurses
American women nurses
St. Catherine University alumni
University of Minnesota School of Nursing alumni
American women chief executives
21st-century African-American people
21st-century African-American women